Sphaeropteris robusta,  synonym Cyathea robusta, is a fern in the family Cyatheaceae. The specific epithet alludes to its robust habit.

Description

The plant is a treefern with a trunk growing up to 5 m in height; the stipe bases are variably persistent, with the lower trunk often clear with roundish scars.

Distribution and habitat
The fern is endemic to Australia’s subtropical Lord Howe Island in the Tasman Sea, where it has a scattered distribution through the southern mountains of the island at low to medium elevations. It is widespread in cultivation outside its natural range.

References

robusta
Endemic flora of Lord Howe Island
Plants described in 1898
Ferns of Australia